Jan Štencel (born February 26, 1995) is a Czech ice hockey defenceman. He made his Czech Extraliga debut playing with HC Vítkovice during the 2012–13 Czech Extraliga season.

References

External links

1995 births
Living people
Czech ice hockey defencemen
HC Kometa Brno players
HC Vítkovice players
Sportspeople from Opava